The history of exploration by citizens or subjects of the Russian Federation, the Soviet Union, the Russian Empire, the Tsardom of Russia and other Russian predecessor states forms a significant part of the history of Russia as well as the history of the world. At , Russia is the largest country in the world, covering more than a ninth of Earth's landmass. In the times of the Soviet Union and the Russian Empire, the country's share in the world's landmass reached 1/6. Most of these territories were first discovered by Russian explorers (if indigenous peoples of inhabited territories are not counted). Contiguous exploration in Eurasia and the building of overseas colonies in Russian America were some of the primary factors in Russian territorial expansion.

Apart from their discoveries in Alaska, Central Asia, Siberia, and the northern areas surrounding the North Pole, Russian explorers have made significant contributions to the exploration of the Antarctic, Arctic, and the Pacific islands, as well as deep-sea and space explorations.

Alphabetical list
Areas primarily explored



A

B

C

D

E

F

G

H

I

J

K

L

M

N

O

P

R

S

T

U

V

W

Y

Z

See also

 1966 Soviet submarine global circumnavigation
 Arctic policy of Russia
 :Category:Russian explorers
 First Russian circumnavigation
 Geography of Russia
 Great Northern Expedition
 List of cosmonauts
 List of explorers
 Northern Sea Route
 Russian Geographical Society
 Siberian River Routes
 Soviet Antarctic Expeditions
 Soviet space program

References

External links

Russian explorers
Explorers
Lists of explorers